Bazlama is a leavened, circular flatbread from Turkish cuisine. It has an average thickness of 2 cm and diameters ranging from 10 to 25 cm.

This popular flatbread is made from wheat flour, water, salt and yeast. After mixing and two to three hours fermentation, 200- to 250-gram pieces of dough are divided, rounded, flattened to a desired thickness and baked on a hot surface. During baking, the bread is turned over to bake the other side. After baking, it is generally consumed fresh. Shelf life of bazlama varies from several hours to a few days, depending on storage conditions.

See also
List of flatbreads

References

Flatbreads
Turkish words and phrases
Turkish breads
Yeast breads